Martin Thomas McMahon (March 21, 1838 – April 21, 1906) was an American jurist and a Union Army officer during the American Civil War. He was awarded the United States military's highest decoration, the Medal of Honor, for his actions at the Battle of White Oak Swamp. After the war, he held various legal and judicial positions in the state of New York. He briefly served as the Minister Resident to Paraguay and was a New York State Senator for four years.

Early life 
McMahon was born in La Prairie, Quebec, Canada, to a family of recent immigrants from Waterford, Ireland. The family moved to the United States when McMahon was an infant and settled in New York. He graduated from St. John's College, Fordham, in 1855 and then studied law in Buffalo, receiving his Master's degree in 1857. After his schooling, he traveled west and worked as a special agent for the post office on the Pacific coast. He was admitted to the Sacramento, California, bar in 1861.

Civil War 
At the outbreak of the Civil War, he raised a company of cavalry and was given the rank of captain at the head of that unit. After learning that his company would not be sent to the front lines, he resigned his command and returned east, where he was appointed aide-de-camp to General George B. McClellan. McMahon remained with the Army of the Potomac throughout the war, eventually rising to the rank of lieutenant colonel. He served as aide de camp to William B. Franklin (May 1862- January 1863) and Chief of Staff and Assistant Adjutant General of the 6th Corps (1 January 1863 to August 1865), serving under John Sedgwick and Horatio G. Wright. McMahon was with 6th Corps commander John Sedgwick at Spotsylvania when Sedgwick was killed. McMahon was the author of Maj. Gen. John Sedgwick - In Memoriam (1885).

Decades after the end of the conflict, on March 10, 1891, he was awarded the Medal of Honor for his actions at the Battle of White Oak Swamp on June 30, 1862. His official citation reads: "Under fire of the enemy, successfully destroyed a valuable train that had been abandoned and prevented it from falling into the hands of the enemy."

McMahon's two older brothers were also officers in the war, both with the 164th New York Volunteer Infantry. John Eugene McMahon (1834–1863) commanded the 164th before being injured; he later died of these injuries. Middle brother James Power McMahon (1836–1864) took over the regiment and led it until his death at the Battle of Cold Harbor.

McMahon was mustered out of the volunteers on February 21, 1866. On January 13, 1866, President Andrew Johnson nominated McMahon for appointment to the grade of brevet brigadier general of volunteers, to rank from March 13, 1865, and the United States Senate confirmed the appointment on March 12, 1866. On March 16, 1866, President Johnson nominated McMahon for appointment to the grade of brevet major general of volunteers, also to rank from March 13, 1865, and the United States Senate confirmed the appointment on April 10, 1866.   After the war, he was elected as a companion of the New York Commandery of the Military Order of the Loyal Legion of the United States.

He received a Doctor of Laws degree from St. John's College, Fordham. He was New York City's corporation counsel for two years before becoming the United States minister to Paraguay, a position he held from 1868 to 1869. After returning to the U.S., he served as the Receiver of Taxes in New York from 1873 to 1885 and then worked as a U.S. Marshal for four years. During this time he became connected with the National Soldiers' Home, of which he would serve as president for several years.

Political career and death 
He was a member of the New York State Assembly (New York Co., 7th D.) in 1891; and of the New York State Senate from 1892 to 1895, sitting in the 115th, 116th (both 8th D.), 117th and 118th New York State Legislatures (both 7th D.). He was elected a judge of the Court of General Sessions in 1896 and held that position until his death. He died suddenly in 1906 at his home in Manhattan, one day after falling ill with pneumonia.

War of the Triple Alliance 

While in his service as Minister Ambassador to Paraguay, he saw the outbreak of the Paraguayan War, also known as War of the Triple Alliance. He was a fierce champion of Francisco Solano López and wrote many articles very favourable to the Paraguayans.

See also 

 List of American Civil War brevet generals (Union)
 United States Ambassador to Paraguay
 Paraguayan War

References

External links 

1838 births
1906 deaths
Fordham University alumni
United States Army Medal of Honor recipients
Union Army officers
Ambassadors of the United States to Paraguay
Members of the New York State Assembly
New York (state) state senators
United States Marshals
People from La Prairie, Quebec
Anglophone Quebec people
American Civil War recipients of the Medal of Honor
19th-century American diplomats
19th-century American politicians
Deaths from pneumonia in New York (state)
Fordham Preparatory School alumni